The NHL's Canadian Division was formed after expansion in 1926. The division existed for 12 seasons until 1938. Despite its name, the division contained at least one team based in the United States throughout its existence.

During its run as a separate division, when considered as a whole the Canadian Division was the slightly less successful of the league's two divisions, winning five Stanley Cup championships compared with seven won by the American Division. Under the cross-over playoff format then in use, Canadian Division teams contested just one intra-divisional Finals, compared to three such series played by American Division teams. Notably however, Canadian teams won all twelve division titles and were the only teams from the division to reach the Finals during this time, also, each of the four Canadian teams then in existence won the Cup at least once.

Division lineups

1926–1927
 Montreal Canadiens
 Montreal Maroons
 New York Americans
 Ottawa Senators
 Toronto St. Patricks

Changes from the 1925–26 season
 The Canadian Division is formed as the result of NHL realignment

1927–1931
 Montreal Canadiens
 Montreal Maroons
 New York Americans
 Ottawa Senators
 Toronto Maple Leafs

Changes from the 1926–27 season
 Toronto changed their nickname from the St. Patricks to the Maple Leafs

1931–1932
 Montreal Canadiens
 Montreal Maroons
 New York Americans
 Toronto Maple Leafs

Changes from the 1930–31 season
 The Ottawa Senators took a leave of absence from the league

1932–1934
 Montreal Canadiens
 Montreal Maroons
 New York Americans
 Ottawa Senators
 Toronto Maple Leafs

Changes from the 1931–32 season
 The Ottawa Senators returned from their absence

1934–1935
 Montreal Canadiens
 Montreal Maroons
 New York Americans
 St. Louis Eagles
 Toronto Maple Leafs

Changes from the 1933–34 season
 The Ottawa Senators moved to St. Louis, Missouri, to become the St. Louis Eagles

1935–1938
 Montreal Canadiens
 Montreal Maroons
 New York Americans
 Toronto Maple Leafs

Changes from the 1934–35 season
 The St. Louis Eagles folded due to financial problems

After the 1937–38 season
The league collapsed into one single table, reverting to the format of the 1925–26 season, after the Montreal Maroons suspended operations in 1938.

Division champions
 1927 – Ottawa Senators (30–10–4, 64 pts)
 1928 – Montreal Canadiens (26–11–7, 59 pts)
 1929 – Montreal Canadiens (22–7–15, 59 pts)
 1930 – Montreal Maroons (23–16–5, 51 pts)
 1931 – Montreal Canadiens (26–10–8, 60 pts)
 1932 – Montreal Canadiens (25–16–7, 57 pts)
 1933 – Toronto Maple Leafs (24–18–6, 54 pts)
 1934 – Toronto Maple Leafs (26–13–9, 61 pts)
 1935 – Toronto Maple Leafs (30–14–4, 64 pts)
 1936 – Montreal Maroons (22–16–10, 54 pts)
 1937 – Montreal Canadiens (24–18–6, 54 pts)
 1938 – Toronto Maple Leafs (24–15–9, 57 pts)

Stanley Cup winners produced
 1927 – Ottawa Senators
 1930 – Montreal Canadiens
 1931 – Montreal Canadiens
 1932 – Toronto Maple Leafs
 1935 – Montreal Maroons

See also
 North Division
 History of the National Hockey League

References
 NHL History

Canadian
Organizations established in 1926
Organizations disestablished in 1938
Ice hockey in Canada